Ma Timi Bina Marihalchhu is 2008 film about an army man who risks his life to save his country. This film features Bhuwan K.C., Jharana Thapa  and Sushmita K.C. in the lead role.

Plot
Bhuwan was going to home after his duty in the army while he was driving his car breaks while he tries to fix it a lady appears in his car. Then Kajal scares Bhuwan Kc in his army office than he finds her than she tells the story about herself. After hearing the story about herself than Bhuwan decides to marry her. After the marriage Bhuwan goes on a mission to rescue a police lady who has been kidnapped. While rescuing her Bhuwan gets kidnapped by them. Than he gets rescued by the army after that he get awarded. While Bhuwan was away his wife gets treated badly by Bhuwan's stepmom who was only interested in his property not in Bhuwan.

Cast
 Bhuwan K.C. as Surya
 Jharana Thapa as Kajal
 Sushmita K.C.
 Kamal Krishna Poudel
 Sushila Rayamajhi
 Arpana Singh
 Sapana Shrestha
 Vijay Deuja
 Laya Sangraula

Soundtrack

Awards

References 

2000s Nepali-language films
2008 films
Nepalese war films
Nepalese action films